The Palvico (it. Torrente Palvico) is an emissary of the lake Lago d'Ampola. Between Tiarno di Sopra and Storo the river flows inside a deep cut canyon through various basins with steps up to 20 m in between. The last bassin opens with a 50 m drop called Buco della Morte (en: Mouth of death) to the valley at Storo.

This potential has been used since 1905 for hydroelectric plants.

Activities 
The basins and drops, together with a limited waterflow make the Palvico a popular destination for canyoneers.

Rivers of Italy
Rivers of Trentino